Stadium Goods is a retailer specialised in the resale of aftermarket sneakers. Based in New York City, it operates shops in SoHo, Manhattan and Chicago, IL, as well as an online store. The store sells sneakers and streetwear, including rare and limited edition sneakers.

History 
Stadium Goods was founded in 2015 by John McPheters and Jed Stiller, who share the role of CEO. In August 2016, Stadium Goods entered the Chinese market through partnership with Alibaba's Tmall, a platform for businesses to sell brand name goods to consumers based in China. In November 2017, during the Single's Day promotion on Alibaba, Stadium Goods reached $3m in sales during a 24-hour period.

In 2018 the company received backing from LVMH Luxury Ventures, and in January 2019 it was acquired by the London-based online retail company Farfetch for $250m.

In 2018, McPheters and Stiller were selected for the Business of Fashion 500 list, the WWD 40 of Tomorrow, and the Footwear News Power 150.

In December 2019, plans were announced for a second store in the U.S., located in Chicago. The store and its associated Intake Center open in October 2020.

In July 2022, Laura Sartor took over as Chief Executive Officer, while Jed Stiller and John McPheters moved into advisory roles.

Concept 

The company runs a sneaker and streetwear resale marketplace specialising in unworn rare and collectable items as well as game-worn sneakers. It operates a consignment model which means that, unlike peer-to-peer marketplaces, the company authenticates products from resellers before taking orders from customers. The model differs from those of many circular fashion retailers in that this step takes place before purchase rather than once a buyer has been found. Sellers don’t list items themselves, but send them to Stadium Goods or drop them off at the company’s stores in Chicago and New York for inspection and verification. The brand maintains warehouses where they store their inventory and ship directly as soon as an item has sold.

Stadium Goods were selling branded merchandise like logo t-shirts, hoodies, and socks from the beginning, and in May 2021 they added a second in-house apparel line, STADIUM. Initially a premium capsule collection of 11 high-end basics like a varsity jacket and a rugby sweater, STADIUM is designed by Greig Bennett, founder of Orchard Street clothing and planned to be kept fresh via regular drops and collaborations.

Stadium Goodsoffer shipping is delivered quite quickly. In the US, delivery typically takes 3 to 5 working days, but it might take up to 15 working days for foreign orders. Typically, express delivery costs $50 and regular deliveries cost $10.Customers can track their orders whenever they wish using the tracking number that was emailed to them. Stadium goods provide very quick customer support. the customer care team is available for 7days a week and their business hour is from 9 am-6 pm EST Monday to Sunday or 9 am-6 pm GMT Monday to Friday. Even they reply to all customer inquiries within 24 hours. read more here

In popular culture 

Stadium Goods’ New York store has been the location for numerous episodes of Complex’s web series Sneaker Shopping, including episodes featuring Will Smith and Martin Lawrence, Billie Eilish, Roger Federer, and Alicia Keys. In 2016, the New York store hosted DJ Khaled and thousands of his friends for his “We the Best” pop-up shop. In 2019 Stadium Goods hosted thousands of fans for a pop-up shop from the gamer group FaZe Clan.

Locations 

 Stadium Goods NYC store, opened in October 2015 in New York City’s SoHo neighborhood
 NYC Intake Center, opened at the same time as, but in a separate space from the retail store to allow people to submit their items in person
 Stadium Goods Chicago Store, a 2 storey shop and gallery space opened in October 2020 in the city’s “Magnificent Mile” shopping district
 Chicago Intake Center, opened in September 2020

References

External links 
 

2015 establishments in New York City
Online retailers of the United States
Shoe companies of the United States
Sneaker culture